= Salvia alatipetiolata =

Scientific classification
- Kingdom: Plantae
- Clade: Tracheophytes
- Clade: Angiosperms
- Clade: Eudicots
- Clade: Asterids
- Order: Lamiales
- Family: Lamiaceae
- Genus: Salvia
- Species: S. alatipetiolata

Binomial name
- Salvia alatipetiolata Sun

Species of flowering plant

Salvia alatipetiolata is a perennial plant that is native to Sichuan province in China, growing on grassy hillsides at 3,800 m (12,500 ft) elevation. The plant grows on erect stems up to 40 cm (16 in) tall, with numerous basal leaves that are ovate-hastate, ranging in size from 3.5 to 6 cm (1.4 to 2.4 in) long and 1.5 to 4.5 cm (0.59 to 1.77 in) wide. The upper leaf surface is mostly smooth, while the underside has many gray hairs.

Inflorescences are of loose raceme-panicles, with a 2 cm (0.79 in) yellowish corolla held in a purple calyx.
